Demetrio is an opera libretto in three acts by Pietro Metastasio. It was first performed to music composed by Antonio Caldara on 4 November 1731 during celebrations of the name day of the Holy Roman Emperor Charles VI in Vienna. Different composers later used it when composing operas named Alceste, Cleonice and Demetrio, rè della Siria. With over fifty settings it was one of Metastasio's most popular works.

Action

The opera is about the seizure of power by the Seleucid king Demetrius II Nicator after his return from exile. The action takes place in Seleucia. The roles in the opera are:
 Cleonice, Queen of Syria, lover of Alceste
 Alceste, later revealed to be king Demetrio 
 Barsene, confidant of Cleonice, secretly in love with Alceste 
 Fenicio, councillor, guardian of Alcestes and father of Olinto
 Olinto, councillor, rival of Alceste
 Mitrane, captain of the guard and friend of Fenicio

The following plot summary is based on the 1734 libretto used in the Brunswick version by Antonio Caldara.

Act 1

Private room: Cleonice has ruled Syria since her father Alexander died in battle: her people expect her to choose a husband who will become the new king. Her councillor Olinto offers himself, but she rejects him as she loves the shepherd Alceste who has also been missing since the battle. Barsene advises her that even if he is still alive she cannot marry him as there are many more deserving suitors. Mitrane arrives and warns that the people are close to starting an uprising. Mitrane loves Barsene, who rejects him as she is secretly also in love with Alceste. Fenicio tells Mitrane that Prince Demetrio, son of the previous king Demetrio, is still alive, although thought to be dead, and is none other than his foster son Alceste. External help is needed to place him on the throne, and Fenicio's plan is to marry him to Cleonice. Unfortunately Alceste cannot be found and Cleonice has to choose another husband.

Magnificent hall with a throne: Cleonice enters, and still has not made up her mind. Fenicio advises her to give herself another three months to think about it. They are interrupted by Mitranes, who reports the arrival of Alceste. Alceste now recounts where he has been: After Alexander lost the battle, almost his entire army was destroyed. He himself survived badly wounded and drifted in the water until he was rescued by a fisherman who took good care of him.

Olinto presses for a new king to be chosen, and tries to prevent  Alceste from joining them, as he is a mere shepherd. Cleonice responds by appointing him general and keeper of the grand seal. Before Cleonice announces her choice, she extracts an oath from those present that they will accept their choice. Since Olinto refuses, Cleonice declares that she wants to give up her crown and leaves without announcing her choice. Mitrane, the nobles and the people also leave the room. Fenicio, Olinto and Alceste remain. Fenicio blames his son. Olinto is disappointed that he doesn't support him, but Fenicio doesn't think he would be a good king. Olinto recognizes a dangerous rival in Alceste despite his poor background.

Inner garden of the royal palace: Fenicio reports to Cleonice and Barsene that the council has refused to accept Cleonice's abdication. Everyone agrees to let her choose her spouse completely freely. Cleonice is not sure however, fearing both to risk putting a shepherd on the throne and losing Alceste if she does not. Alceste arrives and assures her of his love. Concerned that she has placed her personal feelings before her duty, Cleonice dismisses him. When Alceste asks Barsene why Cleonice's behavior has changed, she advises him to find another mistress.

Act 2
A gallery leading to the Queen's chamber: Olinto denies Alceste access to Cleonice and Mitrane confirms that the order comes from Cleonice herself. Alceste leaves disappointed. Olinto still hopes for the throne. Mitrane, however, advises him against it. 
After Olinto leaves, Cleonice and Barsene arrive. Cleonice writes a farewell letter to Alceste. Fenicio comes and asks Cleonice for pity on Alceste, who only wants to see her again once and then die. She tears up the letter and wants to let Alceste come. However Olinto has already ordered Alceste in Cleonice's name to leave the city, and he has left. Cleonice orders the guard to have Alceste found and brought back.
Olinto asks Barsene if she still loves him. She answers mockingly that he has already given up on her. She herself also saved her love for someone else. Olinto is determined not to be dissuaded from his goal.

One of the queen's rooms: Alceste has returned and Cleonice explains her rejection - they must part for the good of the people. They say their farewells. After Alceste leaves, Barsene and Fenicio arrive. Barsene praises Cleonice, but Fenicio blames her. Cleonice leaves and Fenicio accuses Barsene of pursuing her own plans, suspecting that she loves Alceste herself. Barsene admits it. Fenicio realizes that everything is against his plans.

Act 3
Outer court of the palace: Olinto is excited about the forthcoming departure of Alcests. In vain, Fenicio asks that he delay. Cleonice confesses to Alceste that she would rather give up the crown and live in a hut than lose him. She then asks him to follow her to the palace, where she will announce her choice of husband. Olinto,  believing Cleonice has chosen Alceste, decides to take revenge.

Fenicio's room in the palace: Fenicio is concerned about the success of his plan to help Alcestis/Demetrio to power. Mitrane assures him that the ships of his allies are already in sight and Alceste's true identity can soon be revealed. Fenicio instructs Mitrane to secretly gather their troops. Then Olinto brings the news that Cleonice has chosen her husband but it is not Alceste. Alceste and two servants bring Fenicio a cloak, crown, and scepter  - Cleonice has chosen Fenicio and is waiting for him in the temple for the ceremony. Despite their age difference, Alceste thinks it is a wise choice. Fenicio sends Olinto to the temple to announce his arrival. After he leaves, Fenicio reveals to Alceste that he is Demetrio, the true heir of Syria. Barsene hopes that Alceste will now turn to her and confesses her love to him. However, Alceste's thoughts are elsewhere. Barsene gives up her hope of winning him.

Temple of the Sun: Cleonice and Fenicio enter the temple with their retinue and the two servants, still carrying the mantle, crown and scepter. Fenicio assures Cleonice that Alceste is Syria's true heir. Alceste and Mitrane arrive. Cleonice now asks Alceste to ascend his ancestors' throne. He will only do so with her at his side. Barsene arrives and reports of unrest in the city. A hundred ships have landed and Olinto has spread a rumor that Fenicio is planning a trick to seize power.

Olinto comes with an emissary from the ships and brings a sealed letter from the older Demetrio, written shortly before his death. It clearly names Alceste as his son - Fenicio has raised him under an assumed name. Olinto finally recognizes Alceste as king and regrets his previous ambitions. Alceste and Cleonice ascend the throne. At the end of the opera, the chorus praises the couple's virtue, honor and love.

Background

The historical model for Alceste/Demetrio was Demetrius II Nicator whose history was recounted in the eleventh book of Appian's Rhomaika, in the 32nd volume of the Bibliotheca by Diodorus Siculus and in Justin's extract from volumes 35 and 36 of Pompeius Trogus' Historiae Philippicae. The young Demetrius was exiled to Crete by his father Demetrius I Soter to avoid the usurper Alexander Balas. Later, with the help of Greek   mercenaries he was able to return and regain his throne.

The action in Metastasios drama had an antecedent in Pierre Corneilles comédie héroïque Dom Sanche d'Aragon (1649).  Demetrio was his first work written for the court in Vienna and the 1731 performance was a great success with music by Antonio Caldara. In 1732 the castrato Antonio Bernacchi played the role of Alceste in two versions, one by Johann Adolph Hasse in Venice (with Faustina Bordoni as Cleonice) and the other by :de:Gaetano Maria Schiassi in Milan (where Antonia Negri sang Cleonice). The role of Alceste was later played by other famous castrati including Carestini, Farinelli, Senesino und Venanzio Rauzzini.

Settings to music
The following composers have composed operas using this libretto:

Modern performances and recordings
 Johann Simon Mayr: 2011/2012: Performances at the Festival Stand in Moutier, in Poznan and in Ingolstadt as well as a CD by the Orchestre Symphonique du Jura, Opera Obliqua Stand de Moutier, and Opernchor des Teatr Wielki.

External links

 several different versions of the Italian libretto at progettometastasio.it

Digital versions

References

Libretti by Metastasio
1731 operas
Italian-language operas
Operas